Luther Franklin Burleson (November 16, 1880 – November 17, 1924) was an American football, basketball, and baseball coach.  He served as the seventh head football coach at Baylor University, coaching one season in 1907 and compiling a record of 4–3–1.  Burleson was also the first head basketball coach at Baylor, coaching two seasons from 1906 to 1908 and tallying a mark of 10–9.  In addition, he was the head baseball coach at Baylor for three seasons, coaching from 1906 to 1908 and amassing a record of 25–34.

Burleson was also the head football coach at Daniel Baker College in Brownwood, Texas in 1909 and Trinity University in San Antonio, Texas in 1913 and 1918.  Burleson played football and baseball at Trinity.

Head coaching record

Football

References

External links
 

1880 births
1924 deaths
Baylor Bears baseball coaches
Baylor Bears men's basketball coaches
Baylor Bears football coaches
Daniel Baker Hillbillies football coaches
Baylor Bears athletic directors
Trinity Tigers baseball players
Trinity Tigers football coaches
Trinity Tigers football players
People from Buffalo, Texas
Coaches of American football from Texas
Players of American football from Texas
Baseball coaches from Texas
Baseball players from Texas
Basketball coaches from Texas